General Per Micael Bydén (born 13 June 1964) is the Supreme Commander of the Swedish Armed Forces, appointed on 11 September 2015. He was earlier senior commander in the Swedish Air Force. Bydén served as the Chief of Air Force between 2012 and 2015.

Early life
Bydén was born in Gnarp, Sweden, the son of Alvar and Gun Bydén. He did his mandatory military service in Älvsborg Coastal Artillery Regiment (KA 4) in Gothenburg in 1982 and then attended the Coastal Artillery and Navy Officers Academy in Gothenburg and Karlskrona from 1983 to 1985 and was commissioned as second lieutenant in the naval mine and boat service in Härnösand Coastal Artillery Regiment the same year.

Career
He completed the Air Force's basic pilot flight training at the Swedish Air Force Flying School in Ljungbyhed from 1986 to 1987 and was then a fighter pilot at Norrbotten Wing (F 21) from 1989 to 1996. He flew SK 61, SK 60, AJS/SF/SH/JA 37 as well as HKP 6 totaling 1,500 flight hours. Bydén completed the Royal Swedish Air Force Academy's (Flygvapnets krigsskola) general course in Uppsala from 1990 to 1991 and the higher course in 1992.

In 1991, Bydén was promoted to lieutenant and 1992 to captain and 1996 to major. He completed the Swedish National Defence College' tactical course in Stockholm from 1995 to 1996 and was Deputy Squadron Commander at Norrbotten Wing from 1996 to 1997. Bydén completed the Swedish National Defence College' advanced command course from 1997 to 1999 and served as Assistant Air Attaché at the Swedish Embassy in Washington, D.C. from 1999 to 2001. Bydén was promoted to lieutenant-colonel in 2001 and served as Air Attaché at the Swedish Embassy in Washington, D.C. from 2001 to 2002 and then as staff officer at the Air Force Branch at the Swedish Armed Forces Headquarters in Stockholm from 2002 to 2003. Bydén was commanding officer of the Swedish Air Force Flying Training School (Flygvapnets flygskola) in Linköping from 2003 to 2005 and deputy commanding officer of the Swedish Armed Forces Helicopter Wing in Linköping from 2005 to 2008.

He was promoted to colonel in 2006 and served as commanding officer of the Helicopter Wing from 2008 to 2009. Bydén was promoted to brigadier general in 2009 and served as head of the Air Force Training and Development Staff at the Swedish Armed Forces Headquarters in Stockholm from 2009 to 2011. In 2010 he completed the civil/military command course at Solbacka. Bydén was Chief of Staff of the Regional Command North of the International Security Assistance Force (ISAF) in Mazar-i-Sharif, Afghanistan in 2011 before becoming the Inspector of the Air Force (renamed Chief of Air Force in 2014) and head of the Air Component Command with the rank of major general in January 2012, a position he stayed in until being appointed Supreme Commander of the Swedish Armed Forces on 11 September 2015. He took office and was promoted to general on 1 October 2015. In 2017 he said the Swedish army was seriously underfunded and understaffed. In response the Swedish government will increase the military budget by $331 million and reintroduce conscription for 2018.

Personal life
Bydén is married to Anita Carlman and together they have three children. He lives in Södertälje.

Dates of rank
 
1985 – Second lieutenant
1991 – Lieutenant
1992 – Captain
1996 – Major
2001 – Lieutenant colonel
2006 – Colonel
2009 – Brigadier general
2012 – Major general
2015 – General

Awards and decorations
Bydén's awards:

Swedish
  For Zealous and Devoted Service of the Realm
  Swedish Armed Forces Conscript Medal
  Swedish Armed Forces International Service Medal
  National Federation of Voluntary Motor Cycle Corps Medal of Merit in gold (Frivilliga Motorcykelkårernas Riksförbunds förtjänstmedalj i guld, FMCKGM)
  Home Guard Medal of Merit in gold
  Swedish Air Force Volunteers Association Medal of Merit in gold
  Helicopter Wing Gold Medal of Merit (Helikopterflottiljens förtjänstmedalj i guld)
  Swedish Air Force Volunteers Association Merit Badge
  Home Guard Silver Medal
  Swedish Reserve Officers Federation Merit Badge in silver (Förbundet Sveriges Reservofficerares förtjänsttecken i silver)

Foreign
  Commander Grand Cross of the Order of the Lion of Finland (25 September 2020, awarded in November 2020)
  Commander of the Royal Norwegian Order of Merit with star (3 November 2015)
  Commander of the Legion of Honour
  Silver Cross of Honour of the Badge of Honour of the Bundeswehr
  Grand Officer of the Order of Aeronautical Merit
  Officer of the Legion of Merit
  NATO Non-Article 5 medal for ISAF
  Commemorate Medal of the 100th anniversary of the Restoration of Lithuanian Armed Forces

Honours
Member of the Royal Swedish Academy of War Sciences (2016)

References

External links

Bydén's CV

|-

|-

Living people
1964 births
Swedish Air Force generals
People from Nordanstig Municipality
Recipients of the Badge of Honour of the Bundeswehr
Officers of the Legion of Merit
Swedish air attachés
Members of the Royal Swedish Academy of War Sciences